Roger Blades (25 May 1963 – 16 February 2022) was a Barbadian policeman and cricketer. He served in the Bermuda Police Service and represented the Bermuda national cricket team as a fast-medium bowler in the 1990s.

Blades attended Combermere School. He debuted for St Catherine in the Barbados Cricket Association (BCA) first division in 1982. He moved to Bermuda for work reasons in 1989 and joined the Police club. He also played for Somerset in the Cup Match between 1994 and 1996, making 58 on debut from ninth in the batting order. In the 1996 Cup Match he notoriously sent  St George's batsmen Glenn Blakeney and Eugene Foggo to hospital with head injuries inside the first hour of the match.

Blades played seven List A matches for Bermuda as part of the Red Stripe Bowl, and also represented them at the 1997 ICC Trophy. His best figures were 4/30 against the Windward Islands in the 1996 Red Stripe Bowl in Guyana.

In 1998 Blades returned to Barbados where he continued to play club cricket. He later worked for Barbados National Bank. He died at Queen Elizabeth Hospital, Bridgetown, on 16 February 2022 after a long illness.

References

External links
Cricinfo profile
Cricket Archive profile

1963 births
2022 deaths
Bermudian cricketers
Barbadian cricketers
Barbadian expatriates in Bermuda
Barbadian police officers
Bermudian police officers
People educated at Combermere School